Leung Tin Tsuen is a village in Tuen Mun District, Hong Kong.

Administration
Leung Tin Tsuen is one of the 36 villages represented within the Tuen Mun Rural Committee. For electoral purposes, Leung Tin Tsuen is part of the San Hui constituency, which was formerly represented by Cheung Ho-sum until May 2021.

See also
 Leung King Estate
 San Wai Court
 Tin King Estate

References

External links

 Delineation of area of existing village Leung Tin Tsuen (Tuen Mun) for election of resident representative (2019 to 2022)

Villages in Tuen Mun District, Hong Kong